Francis Charlton "Diver" Dunne (13 August 1875 – 16 February 1937) was an Australian rules footballer who played with St Kilda in the Victorian Football League (VFL), South Fremantle in the West Australian Football Association (WAFA) and Sturt in the South Australian Football League (SAFL).

Family
The son of William Dunne (1833-1889), and Annie Theresa Dunne (1837-1896), née Murphy, Francis Charlton Dunne was born in Kilmore, Victoria on 13 August 1875.

He married Matilda Bridget Fensling (1877-1960) in Adelaide in 1902.

Football
Dunne was recruited to St. Kilda from Albury in the Ovens and Murray Football League. 

During his time at South Fremantle and Sturt he was considered one of the best "ruck shepherds" in the game,  and represented Western Australia at the 1908 Melbourne Carnival and South Australia at the 1911 Adelaide Carnival.

Death
He died at Forestville, South Australia on 16 February 1937.

See also
 1908 Melbourne Carnival
 1911 Adelaide Carnival

Footnotes

References

External links 

1872 births
1937 deaths
St Kilda Football Club players
South Fremantle Football Club players
Sturt Football Club players
Australian rules footballers from Victoria (Australia)